The eighth season of The Real Housewives of New Jersey, an American reality television series, airing on Bravo in the United States. The season was primarily filmed in 2017. The season was announced by Bravo on August 22, 2017. The season premiered on October 4, 2017. The season finale aired on January 10, 2018, and a two-part reunion special in January 2018.

The season focuses on the lives of returning cast members Teresa Giudice, Melissa Gorga, Dolores Catania, Siggy Flicker and new cast member Margaret Josephs. Original cast member Danielle Staub returns to the series, appearing as a friend of the housewives.

Production and crew
The Real Housewives of New Jersey was officially renewed for its eighth season on April 27, 2017. Amy Kohn, Luke Neslage, Rebecca Toth Diefenbach, Valerie Haselton, Lucilla D'Agostino, and Andy Cohen are recognized as the series' executive producers; it is produced and distributed by Sirens Media.

Cast and synopsis 

In April 2017, Jacqueline Laurita announced she had departed the series. In May 2017, former housewife and recurring cast member Kathy Wakile also confirmed she would not be returning to the series. Teresa Giudice, Melissa Gorga, Dolores Catania, and Siggy Flicker returned for the season, while former housewife Danielle Staub returned in a "friend of" capacity. Former friend-of, DePaola also returns in a guest capacity. Laurita’s departure made Giudice the only remaining original cast member as of season nine.

Episodes

References

External links

2017 American television seasons
2018 American television seasons
New Jersey (season 8)